Home Foodie is a Philippine television informative show broadcast by GMA Network. Hosted by Iya Villania and Drew Arellano, it premiered on August 10, 2015 on the network's morning line up. The show concluded on September 6, 2019.

Hosts 
 Drew Arellano (2015-2019)
 Iya Villania (2016-2019)

Accolades

References

External links
 

2015 Philippine television series debuts
2019 Philippine television series endings
Filipino-language television shows
Philippine cooking television series
GMA Network original programming